Staphylinochrous holotherma is a species of moth of the Anomoeotidae family. It is found in Kenya.

References

Endemic moths of Kenya
Anomoeotidae
Moths of Africa
Moths described in 1920